Astrid Besser (born 1 September 1989 in Prato) is an Italian tennis player of German and Venezuelan descent.

Besser won two singles and two doubles titles on the ITF tour in her career. On 9 March 2009, she reached her best singles ranking of world number 356. On 16 June 2008, she peaked at world number 401 in the doubles rankings.

On the 2008 WTA Tour, Besser played in the main doubles draws at both the Gastein Ladies and the Banka Koper Slovenia Open.

ITF finals (4–1)

Singles (2–0)

Doubles (2–1)

References

External links
 
 

1989 births
Living people
People from Prato
Italian female tennis players
Italian people of German descent
Italian people of Venezuelan descent
Sportspeople from the Province of Prato